Ian Henderson (31 October 1918 – 11 June 1991) was a Scotland international rugby union player.

Rugby Union career

Amateur career

He played for Edinburgh Academicals RFC.

Provincial career

He was capped for Edinburgh District.
He represented Scotland Probables in 1947.

International career

Family

His brother James McLaren Henderson – Mac Henderson – was also capped for Scotland, and became the oldest living Scottish international in his later years.

References

Sources

 Bath, Richard (ed.) The Scotland Rugby Miscellany (Vision Sports Publishing Ltd, 2007 )

1918 births
1991 deaths
Edinburgh Academicals rugby union players
Edinburgh District (rugby union) players
Rugby union players from Tranent
Scotland international rugby union players
Scotland Probables players
Scottish rugby union players
Rugby union props